Euphorbia leptoclada is a species of plant in the family Euphorbiaceae. It is endemic to Yemen.  Its natural habitat is subtropical or tropical dry shrubland.

References

Endemic flora of Socotra
leptoclada
Data deficient plants
Taxonomy articles created by Polbot
Taxa named by Isaac Bayley Balfour